Crimewatch File was a British television programme which reconstructed the investigation of a single case that had previously been covered by Crimewatch which viewers had previously helped to solve.

History
Broadcast on BBC One, it was aired on an ad hoc basis and presented by Nick Ross and Sue Cook concurrently (with Jill Dando taking over from Cook in 1996 until her death), more than thirty editions aired until April 2000, when the final edition, fronted by Ross, was broadcast. Following the show's demise, in latter years of the main Crimewatch programme, episodes would regularly feature segments and reports on solved cases previously featured on the programme in a very similar vein to Crimewatch File.

Transmissions

See also
Crimewatch

References

External links

1980s British crime television series
1988 British television series debuts
1990s British crime television series
2000s British crime television series
2000 British television series endings
BBC crime television shows
Law enforcement in the United Kingdom
File
English-language television shows